Bring Us Together is the third album by Danish pop band The Asteroids Galaxy Tour. The album was recorded at Viktoria Recording Studio, Copenhagen and was released on September 15, 2014 by Hot Bus Records.

Track listing

Release history

Notes

2014 albums
The Asteroids Galaxy Tour albums